Rashiram Debbarma was an Indian politician. He was elected as MLA of Mandaibazar Vidhan Sabha Constituency in Tripura Legislative Assembly in 1977, 1983, 1988 and 1993. He died on 5 August 2019.

Rashiram Debbarma contested against Kashirode Debbarma in 1977 from Mandaibazar Assembly and he won.

He contested again in 1983,1988,1993 from this same assembly and he won.

See also
 Manoranjan Debbarma
 Radhacharan Debbarma
 Jitendra Choudhury

References

2019 deaths
Communist Party of India (Marxist) politicians
Tripuri people
Tripura MLAs 1977–1983
Tripura MLAs 1983–1988
Tripura MLAs 1988–1993
Tripura MLAs 1993–1998